

Historical and architectural interest bridges

Major road and railway bridges 
This table presents the structures with spans greater than 100 meters (non-exhaustive list).

Alphabetical list 

 Afghanistan-Iran Bridge in Zaranj, Nimroz Province
 Afghanistan-Tajikistan Bridge at Sher Khan Bandar in Kunduz Province
 Afghanistan–Uzbekistan Friendship Bridge at Hairatan in Balkh Province
 Bar Shultan Bridge ( Kunar Province)
 Behsud Bridge in Jalalabad, Nangarhar Province
 Guryak Truck Bridge in Kunar Province
 Kandahar-Helmand Bridge (Bagh-e Pul), Kandahar Province
 Kandahar-Urozgan Bridge in Kandahar Province
 Khan Kunar Bridge ( Kunar province)
 Lal Pur Bridge in Jalalabad, Nangarhar Province
 Malan Bridge (Pul-e Malan) in Herat, Herat Province
 Pashad Bridge in Kunar Province
 Saw Bridge in Kunar Province

See also 

 Transport in Afghanistan
 Rail transport in Afghanistan
 Geography of Afghanistan
 List of bridges in Konar Province

Notes and references 
 Notes

 

 Others references

External links 

 
 

Afghanistan
 
Bridges
Bridges